WDOE is an AM/FM radio station located in Dunkirk, New York. It is owned by Alan Bishop and George Kimble, who also own sister station WBKX in Fredonia. The station operates on an AM frequency of 1410 kHz. On December 7, 2012, WDOE began simulcasting on an FM translator at 94.9 MHz. On November 5, 2020, it added a second FM signal at 101.5 MHz.  The station then dropped is 94.9 FM signal in the spring of 2022.

WDOE operates a mostly automated classic hits format and features two local newsmen, Dave Rowley and Greg Larson.  Dan Palmer hosts the morning show from 6:00-8:45 AM, and Dave hosts "Viewpoint," a daily 15-minute public affairs program. The station also broadcasts local high school football, basketball, baseball, and softball games, mainly for Dunkirk and Fredonia high schools.

On Saturdays, WDOE broadcasts the nationally syndicated Backtrax USA from 5:00-7:00 PM and American Top 40: The 1970s from 7:00-10:00 PM.  Sunday mornings at 10:00 AM, local personality Tina Zboch hosts an hour-long polka show.

WDOE also serves as an affiliate of ABC News and Buffalo Bills football. Former Bills announcer Van Miller was one of the station's first employees.
Danny Neaverth also worked at the station in the late 1950s.

External links
WDOE Official Website

DOE